|}

The Reynoldstown Novices' Chase is a Grade 2 National Hunt steeplechase in Great Britain which is open to horses aged five years or older. It is run at Ascot over a distance of about 3 miles (2 miles, 7 furlongs and 180 yards, or ), and during its running there are twenty fences to be jumped. The race is for novice chasers, and it is scheduled to take place each year in February.

The event is named in honour of the racehorse Reynoldstown, a dual winner of the Grand National in the 1930s. The Reynoldstown Novices' Chase serves as a trial for the RSA Insurance Novices' Chase in March. The last horse to win both races in the same year was O'Faolains Boy in 2014. The race is currently sponsored by Sodexo.

Winners

See also
 Horse racing in Great Britain
 List of British National Hunt races

References
 Racing Post:
 
 pedigreequery.com – Reynoldstown Novices' Chase – Ascot.

External links
 Race Recordings 1980–2005 

National Hunt races in Great Britain
Ascot Racecourse
National Hunt chases